Wilhelm Braun may refer to:

Wilhelm Braun (1897–1969), German cross-country skier
Wilhelm Braune (1850–1926), German philologist and Germanist